OnlyOffice (formerly TeamLab), stylized as ONLYOFFICE, is a free software office suite and ecosystem of collaborative applications developed by Ascensio System SIA, a subsidiary of "New Communication Technologies", a company from Russia, but headquartered in Riga, Latvia. In Russian market branded as P7-Office. It features online document editors, platform for document management, corporate communication, mail and project management tools.

OnlyOffice is delivered either as SaaS or as an installation for deployment on a private network. Access to the system is provided through a private online portal.

Online editors 
OnlyOffice includes an online editing suite called OnlyOffice Docs. It combines text, spreadsheet, presentation and form editors that include features similar to Microsoft desktop editors (Word, Excel and PowerPoint). Since version 5.0 of the editors the interface has been renewed with a tabbed toolbar. Editors allow co-editing with two collaboration modes, real-time and paragraph-locking. Communication tools include commenting and chatting. The editors also provide such features as Revision History and Track Changes.

The beta version of OnlyOffice Docs predecessor, Teamlab Document Editor, was introduced at CeBIT 2012 in Hannover. The product was built using Canvas, a part of HTML5 that allows dynamic, scriptable rendering of 2D shapes and bitmap images.

The basic type of formats used in OnlyOffice Docs is OOXML (DOCX, XLSX, PPTX) and own DOCXF and OFORM. Other types of supported formats (ODT, DOC, RTF, EPUB, MHT, HTML, HTM, ODS, XLS, CSV, ODP, PPT, DOTX, XLTX, POTX, OTT, OTS, OTP, XML, XPS, DjVu and PDF-A) are processed with inner conversion to DOCX, XLSX or PPTX if editing is possible. 

Functionality of the suite can be extended using plugins (side applications). Users can choose from the existing list of plugins or create their own applications using the provided API. OnlyOffice Docs also supports integration via WOPI.

In 2022, together with the release of version 7.0 of OnlyOffice Docs, the project introduced OnlyOffice Forms, a new functionality of the document editor for creation and filling forms (document templates with fillable fields). It introduced two new formats, .OFORM and .DOCXF. The form editor also allows exporting templates as fillable PDFs.

Сollaboration platform 
The interface of OnlyOffice is divided into several modules: Documents, CRM, Projects, Mail, Community, Calendar and Talk. They are combined in a bundle called OnlyOffice Groups which is a part of OnlyOffice Workspace together with OnlyOffice Docs.

The Documents module is a document management and sharing system for OnlyOffice files. The integrated audio and video player allows playing media from files stored in OnlyOffice.

The Projects module is developed for managing project stages: planning, team management and task delegation, monitoring and reporting. This module also includes Gantt charts for illustrating the projects stages and dependencies between tasks.

The CRM module allows maintaining client databases, transactions and potential sales, tasks, client relationship history. This module also provides online billing and sales reports.

The Mail module combines a mail server for creating own-domain mailboxes and mail aggregator for centralized management of multiple mailboxes.

The Calendar module allows planning and monitoring of personal and corporate events, task deadlines in Projects and CRM, sending and receiving invitations to events.

The Community module offers corporate social network features: polls, corporate blog and forums, news, orders and announcements, and a messenger.

Technology 
It is technologically based on three components: Document Server, Community Server and Mail Server.

The Document server maintains text document, spreadsheet and presentation editors and is written in JavaScript using HTML5 Canvas element.

The Community server hosts all functional modules of OnlyOffice. It is written in ASP.NET for Windows and in Mono for Linux and distributions.

The Mail server represents set of components that allows creating corporate mailbox using default or custom domain names. Mail Server is based on the iRedMail package which consists of Postfix, Dovecot, SpamAssassin, ClamAV, OpenDKIM, Fail2ban.

Desktop and mobile apps 
OnlyOffice Desktop is an offline version of OnlyOffice editing suite. The desktop application supports collaborative editing features when connected to the portal, Nextcloud, ownCloud, kDrive, Seafile, or Liferay. It is offered free of charge for both personal and commercial usage.

The desktop editors are cross-platform available for Windows XP or later (x32 and x64), Debian, Ubuntu and other Linux distributions based on RPM, Mac OS 10.10 and newer, including computers built on Apple Silicon. Besides platform-specific versions there is also a portable option. OnlyOffice Desktop Editors are available for installation as Flatpak, snap and AppImage packages on Linux.

Editors are compatible with MS Office (OOXML) and OpenDocument (ODF) formats and support DOC, DOCX, ODT, RTF, TXT, PDF, HTML, EPUB, XPS, DjVu, XLS, XLSX, ODS, CSV, PPT, PPTX, ODP, DOTX, XLTX, POTX, OTT, OTS, OTP, and PDF-A.

Like the online editing suite, the basic toolset of OnlyOffice Desktop can be upgraded using side plugins.

The desktop editors are distributed under AGPL-3.0-only license for personal and commercial usage.

OnlyOffice editors are also available as mobile application for iOS and Android. The application is called ONLYOFFICE Documents.

In early 2019, OnlyOffice announced the launch of a developer preview of end-to-end encryption of documents (files themselves, online editing and collaboration) that involves blockchain technology and is included in the functionality of the desktop suite. In 2020, the developers announced Private Rooms based on AES-256 algorithm and RSA asymmetric encryption.

OnlyofficeDesktop Editors is available by default in the following operating systems:

History 
 In 2009, a group of software developers, headed by Lev Bannov, launched a project called TeamLab, a platform for internal team collaboration that encompassed several social computing features (e.g. blog, forum, wiki, bookmarks).
 In March 2012, TeamLab introduced the first HTML5-based document editors at CeBIT.
 In July 2014, Teamlab Office was officially rebranded to OnlyOffice and the source code of the product was published on SourceForge and GitHub on terms of AGPL-3.0-only.
 In March 2016, the developers of OnlyOffice released a desktop application – OnlyOffice Desktop Editors, which is positioned as an open source alternative to Microsoft Office.
 In February 2017, the app for integration with ownCloud/Nextcloud was launched.
In February 2018, OnlyOffice Desktop Editors became available as a snap package.
In January 2019, OnlyOffice announced the release of end-to-end encryption functionality.
In August 2019, Document Builder was published on GitHub under the AGPL-3.0-only licence.
In November 2019, OnlyOffice entered the AWS Marketplace.
In January 2020, OnlyOffice launched App Directory.
In September 2020, OnlyOffice rebranded its product portfolio, introducing OnlyOffice Workspace, OnlyOffice Docs, and OnlyOffice Groups. It also released Groups (collaboration platform) under the Apache license.
In October 2020, OnlyOffice announced compliance with HIPAA.
In September 2021, OnlyOffice added support for the WOPI.
In October 2021, OnlyOffice received the Cloud Computer Insider’s Gold award.
In 2023, OnlyOffice opens new offices in Armenia, Singapore, and Uzbekistan.

OnlyOffice Docs integrations

See also 

 Collaboration platform
 Collaboration software
 List of collaborative software
 Project management software
 List of project management software

References

External links 
 

2009 software
Customer relationship management software
Document management systems
Office suites for Linux
Project management software
Software using the GNU AGPL license